Sylvia Hanika and Claudia Kohde-Kilsch won in the final 7–5, 6–7, 6–4 against Lori McNeil and Jana Novotná.

Seeds
Champion seeds are indicated in bold text while text in italics indicates the round in which those seeds were eliminated.

 Lori McNeil /  Jana Novotná (final)
 Nicole Provis /  Elizabeth Smylie (quarterfinals)
 Catarina Lindqvist /  Maria Lindström (semifinals)
 Tine Scheuer-Larsen /  Maria Strandlund (quarterfinals)

Draw

References
 1988 Southern Cross Classic Doubles Draw

Southern Cross Classic
1988 WTA Tour
1988 in Australian tennis